Streib is a surname. Notable people with the surname include:

Max Streib (1912–1989), Swiss field handball player
Werner Streib (1911–1986), German Luftwaffe fighter ace

See also
The Streibs, a fictional civilization in the science-fiction television show Babylon 5